Caterham railway station serves the town of Caterham in the Tandridge district of Surrey.

Caterham train drivers depot was opened on Sunday 17 June 1928 as a motormans depot (the "motor" term being used for electric trains) after electrification on the line was complete in March of that year, and is still a working depot today. The guards depot at Caterham was closed in the late 1980s.

Location
The station is located at the southern terminus of the Caterham Line, which branches from the Brighton Main Line at Purley.

History
The town's first station was originally opened on 5 August 1856 by the Caterham Railway. It was closed on 1 January 1900 by the South Eastern and Chatham Railway, which opened a new station of the same name on an adjacent site that day. The site of the original station is now occupied by a supermarket and the present station's car park. The line was electrified (on the 660 V DC system) by the Southern Railway in March 1928.

On 26 June 1945, two motormen were killed, and some passengers injured, when two trains collided. The inquiry found that an inattentive motorman had passed a signal at danger.

Today the station and all trains serving it are operated by the Southern train operating company. It has a single island platform with a one-storey ticket office dating from just before the turn of the 20th century. There is a carriage siding on the western (Up) side of the station.

Other transport links 
The station is served by the following bus services:
 London Buses route 407 to Purley, Croydon and Sutton
 Metrobus route 400 to Redhill, Gatwick Airport, Crawley and East Grinstead
 Southdown PSV routes 409 and 411 to Selsdon, Warlingham, East Grinstead, Redhill and Reigate
 Buses 4U route 540 to Woldingham

Services 

All services at Caterham are operated by Southern using  EMUs.

The typical off-peak service in trains per hour is 2 semi-fast tph to London Bridge.

Up until September 2022 there were additional off-peak services to London Bridge via Norbury and Tulse Hill.

References

External links 

Map of line and timetables

Railway stations in Surrey
Former South Eastern Railway (UK) stations
Railway stations in Great Britain opened in 1856
Railway stations in Great Britain closed in 1900
Railway stations in Great Britain opened in 1900
Railway stations served by Govia Thameslink Railway